Etawah Lok Sabha constituency is one of the 80 Lok Sabha (parliamentary) constituencies in Uttar Pradesh state in northern India.

Assembly segments

Members of Parliament

Election results

See also
 Etawah district
 List of Constituencies of the Lok Sabha

Notes

Lok Sabha constituencies in Uttar Pradesh
Etawah district